Vsevolod Nikolayevich Aksyonov (19 April 1902 – 29 March 1960) was a Soviet and Russian stage and film actor. Honored Artist of the RSFSR (1947).

Filmography
 Suvorov (1940) – Meshchersky
 The Russian Question (1947) – Harry Smith
Conspiracy of the Doomed (1950) – Nikola Sloveno
 Zhukovsky (1950) – as Grand Duke Alexander Mikhailovich
 Far from the Motherland (1960) – as Willi Berthold

Awards 

 Medal "For Valiant Labour in the Great Patriotic War 1941–1945"
 Medal "In Commemoration of the 800th Anniversary of Moscow"
 Honored Artist of the RSFSR (1947)
 Stalin Prize, 1st class (1948) – for his portrayal of Harry Smith in The Russian Question

References

External links 
 
 

1902 births
1960 deaths
20th-century Russian male actors
Male actors from Moscow
Honored Artists of the RSFSR
Stalin Prize winners

Russian drama teachers
Russian male film actors
Russian male silent film actors
Russian male stage actors
Soviet drama teachers
Soviet male film actors
Soviet male silent film actors
Soviet male stage actors
Spoken word artists
Burials at Novodevichy Cemetery